William Nolan (born 26 January 1954) is a Scottish prelate of the Catholic Church who has been Archbishop of Glasgow since February 2022. He was previously Bishop of Galloway from 2015 to 2022.

Early life
William Nolan was born on 26 January 1954 and baptised in St Patrick’s Church, Craigneuk. He was the fourth of eleven children born to William and Catherine Nolan and has five brothers and five sisters. He attended Cathedral Primary School, Motherwell, St Patrick’s Primary School, Craigneuk, St Vincent’s College, Langbank, and, from 1967 to 1971, St Mary’s College, Blairs.

Priest
Nolan completed his studies for ordination at the Pontifical Scots College, Rome, from 1971 to 1978, earning a license in sacred theology from the Gregorian University in June 1978.

Nolan was ordained priest for the Diocese of Motherwell on 30 June 1977. He was assistant priest at Our Lady of Lourdes, East Kilbride, from 1978 to 1980 and at St. David’s, Plains, from 1980 to 1983. He was Vice-Rector of the Scots College in Rome from 1983 to 1990. Returning to Scotland, he was assistant priest at St Bridget’s, Baillieston, from 1990 to 1994. While parish priest at Our Lady of Lourdes, East Kilbride, from 1994 to 2014 he held several other assignments, including judge of the National Ecclesisatical Tribunal in Scotland, dean of his zone, head of permanent formation of the clergy of Motherwell, and a member and vice-president of the Presbyteral Council. He became vicar general of the Motherwell Diocese in June 2014.

In 2013, Nolan was appointed administrator of St John Ogilvie Parish in Blantyre when its pastor, Matthew Despard, was suspended during a canonical investigation. Despard had published an attack on the Church hierarchy and tangled with Bishop Joseph Toal, apostolic administrator of the diocese. Despard's refusal to accept his removal produced an extended dispute with Nolan.

Bishop
Pope Francis appointed Nolan on 22 November 2014 to succeed John Cunningham as bishop of Galloway. Nolan received his episcopal consecration on 14 February 2015 from Leo Cushley. The Apostolic Nuncio Archbishop Antonio Mennini and Bishop emeritus Maurice Taylor served as principal co-consecrators. At the time of his appointment, the Galloway diocese had "a troubled history of rebel priests" and Nolan's predecessor had been incapacitated by poor health for several years.

He managed the scandal of a priest of the diocese who stole parish funds to support a gambling addiction in 2015 and was jailed in June 2016. Nolan suffered a heart attack in August 2016.

In January 2021, Nolan called upon the UK government to sign the Treaty on the Prohibition of Nuclear Weapons and abandon its nuclear arsenal. In May 2021, along with Bishop Paul McAleenan, he criticized the government's plans for asylum seekers. In 2021, he established a Scotland-wide Care of Creation Office to reflect the priorities of Pope Francis' encyclical Laudato Si' and anticipating the 2021 United Nations Climate Change Conference in Glasgow in November.

On 4 February 2022, Pope Francis appointed him to succeed Philip Tartaglia as archbishop of Glasgow. He was installed there on 26 February.

He is the president of Justice and Peace Scotland, a national body that advocates on a variety of social issues from climate change to nuclear weapons. He serves on the board of the Scottish Catholic International Aid Fund. Within the Scottish Bishops Conference he heads the Commission on Justice and Peace  and The Tablet magazine has described him as "Scotland’s justice and peace bishop".

References

 

1954 births
Living people
Pontifical Gregorian University alumni
Bishops appointed by Pope Francis
21st-century Roman Catholic bishops in Scotland
Bishops of Galloway (Roman Catholic, Post-Reformation)
21st-century Roman Catholic archbishops in Scotland
Scottish Roman Catholic bishops